Jordy is a masculine given name. 

Jordy may also refer to:

People
 Jordy (singer) (born 1988), French singer Jordy Lemoine
 Nicolas Louis Jordy (1758–1825), French general in the French Revolutionary Wars and Napoleonic Wars; see Army of the Rhine and Moselle
 William Jordy (1917–1997), American architectural historian
 Jordi El Niño Polla (born 1994), Spanish pornographic actor

Other uses
 JORDY (Joint Optical Reflective Display), electronic compensatory visual aid

See also 
 Jordi (disambiguation)
 Geordie (disambiguation)
 Geordi La Forge, a character from Star Trek: The Next Generation